Malocampa is a genus of moths of the family Notodontidae.

Selected species
Malocampa bolivari (Schaus, 1894)
Malocampa confusa Thiaucourt & Miller, 2011
Malocampa piratica Schaus, 1906
Malocampa puella Dyar, 1908
Malocampa punctata (Stoll, 1780)

References

Notodontidae